Marasmiellus scandens is a plant pathogen that causes white thread on cocoa.

References

Fungal tree pathogens and diseases
Cacao diseases
Marasmiaceae